Jeanvion Yulu-Matondo (born 5 January 1986) is a Belgian footballer with Congolese roots who last played for Romanian club Oțelul Galați as a striker.

Career

Youth career 
Yulu-Matondo started his career at the small team of R. Ans F.C. but was discovered by Jupiler League team R.E. Mouscron where he joined the youth team. He developed further with Club Brugge, where he has successfully managed the step from the youth team to the first team.

Club Brugge K.V. 
After four years in the youth team, Yulu-Matondo started playing for the first team of Club Brugge in 2005. He scored a goal for Club Brugge in the UEFA Champions League against Juventus.

Roda JC 
In the summer of 2007, he moved from Club Brugge to Roda JC.

Levski Sofia 
On 30 January 2011, it was announced that Levski Sofia had signed Yulu-Matondo.

K.V.C. Westerlo 
On 8 September 2011, he returned to near Belgium, joining K.V.C. Westerlo and signing a one-year contract.

Bury FC 
On 11 February 2013, Jeanvion Yulu-Matondo signed for then League 1 outfit Bury FC on non-contract terms after a three-week trial. But after playing in a reserve game against Bolton Wanderers, he was let go by manager Kevin Blackwell.

Honours
Club Brugge
Belgian Cup: 2006–07

References

External links

 Profile at LevskiSofia.info

1986 births
Living people
Footballers from Kinshasa
Belgian footballers
Belgium youth international footballers
Democratic Republic of the Congo footballers
Belgian people of Democratic Republic of the Congo descent
Democratic Republic of the Congo emigrants to Belgium
Club Brugge KV players
Roda JC Kerkrade players
Bury F.C. players
PFC Levski Sofia players
K.V.C. Westerlo players
ASC Oțelul Galați players
Belgian Pro League players
Eredivisie players
First Professional Football League (Bulgaria) players
Liga I players
Belgian expatriate footballers
Belgian expatriate sportspeople in Bulgaria
Belgian expatriate sportspeople in England
Belgian expatriate sportspeople in the Netherlands
Belgian expatriate sportspeople in Romania
Expatriate footballers in Bulgaria
Expatriate footballers in Egypt
Expatriate footballers in England
Expatriate footballers in the Netherlands
Expatriate footballers in Romania
Association football forwards